Faxonius kentuckiensis, the Kentucky crayfish, is a species of crayfish in the family Cambaridae. It is endemic to the United States.

References

External links

Cambaridae
Fauna of the United States
Freshwater crustaceans of North America
Crustaceans described in 1944
Taxobox binomials not recognized by IUCN